Pingdingshan, also known as Eagle City, is a prefecture-level city in central Henan province, China. It had 4,904,701 inhabitants at the 2010 census whom 1,756,333 lived in the built-up (or metro) area including Ye county being conurbated.

History
In Chinese, Pingdingshan means "mountain with a flat top". The city is named after a nearby plateau, the top of which is very flat. The reason for the nickname of the city "Eagle City" can be traced back to two thousand years ago during the "Spring and Autumn Annals". There was a small country royal named Ying who lived in Pingdingshan area. In ancient times, the word "Ying" had the same pronunciation as Eagle in Chinese, therefore people also called Pingdingshan "Eagle City".

Pingdingshan was established as a prefecture-level city in 1957.

Geography 
Pingdingshan borders the provincial capital of Zhengzhou to the north, Xuchang and Luohe to the east, Zhumadian to the southeast, Nanyang to the south, and Luoyang to the west.

The Funiu Mountains run through the west of Pingdingshan, and the North China Plains occupy the city's eastern portion. Mount Yao is located in the city. Over 30 rivers run through the city, and 163 lakes and reservoirs are located in Pingdingshan.

Climate

Politics

CCP Municipal Committee Secretary 
Since July 2021,  has served as Pingdingshan's Chinese Communist Party Committee Secretary.

Mayor 

From 2003.08 to 2005.04 Wang Zhaoping was the Mayor of Pingdingshan. From 2005.04 to 2008.03 Zhao Qinglin was the Mayor of Pingdingshan. From 2008.03 to 2010.10 Li Endong was the Mayor of Pingdingshan. From 2010.10 to 2013.04 Chen Jiansheng was the Mayor of Pingdingshan. From 2013.04 to January 2018 Zhang Guowei was the Mayor of Pingdingshan. Zhang Leiming, the current CCP Municipal Committee Secretary, had served as the Mayor from January 2018 until July 2021.

Administration
The prefecture-level city of Pingdingshan administers 4 districts, 2 county-level cities and 4 counties.

Demographics 
Pingdingshan has a permanent population of about 4,987,100 as of 2020.

According to a 2019 publication by the city's government, there are 79,467 people (1.8% of the total population) in Pingdingshan who are ethnic minorities, representing 48 different recognized groups. The largest ethnic minority in Pingdingshan is the Hui people, who number 62,040, accounting for 77.8% of the city's total ethnic minority population. Other sizable ethnic minority populations in Pingdingshan include the Manchus, who number 8,780, and the Mongols, who number 6,096. The remaining 45 ethnic groups account for just 2,551 people. Zhanhe District, Jia County, and Ye County all have over 10,000 people who identify as ethnic minorities. There are 18 schools throughout the city designated for ethnic minorities: 1 Mongol primary school, 15 Hui primary schools, and two Hui secondary schools.

Economy

Pingdingshan's economy has grown rapidly in the 21st century, with the city's gross domestic product (GDP) more than doubling from 112.781 billion renminbi (RMB) in 2009 to 245.584 billion in 2020. Pingdingshan had been identified by the Economist Intelligence Unit in the November 2010 Access China White Paper as a member of the CHAMPS (Chongqing, Hefei, Anshan, Maanshan, Pingdingshan and Shenyang), an economic profile of the top 20 emerging cities in China. The city's economy is largely reliant on its secondary and tertiary sectors, which comprise 110.803 billion RMB (45.12% of total GDP) and 114.318 billion RMB (46.55% of total GDP), respectively. The city's primary sector comprises just 20.464 billion RMB (8.33% of total GDP). The city's tertiary sector has seen particularly rapid growth during this period, growing by about 300% from 2009 to 2020.

Natural resources 
Pingdingshan hosts one of the largest coal fields in all of China, and has attracted international attention for its prominent coal mining industry. However, beginning in the latter half of the 2010s, coal production in the city began declining, due to a depletion of the city's coal mines, increased environmental regulations, and a series of high-profile mining accidents. Sodium and iron are mined on a large-scale in Pingdingshan, and other mineral resources include manganese, aluminum, fluorite, and gypsum. Pingdingshan has about 10 billion tons of coal reserves, the largest coalfield area in the South and East of China; well known as "the coal storage of the central area of China". The city also 230 billion tons of salt reserves, ranking first in Henan province, second in China. Henan province houses some of the biggest limestone reserves in China estimated over 24 billion tons, Pindingshan is the cement center for limestone mine production and quarrying in the province.

Education

Colleges and universities
Pingdingshan University

High schools
Pingdingshan No.1 Middle School
Pingdingshan No.1 High School
Pingdingshan No.2 Middle School
Pingdingshan No.2 High School
Pingdingshan No.3 High School
Pingdingshan No.8 Middle School
Pingdingshan Experimental High School
Lushan No. 1 Middle School

Religion 
Pingdingshan has state-sanctioned Buddhist, Taoist, Islamic, Catholic, and Protestant organizations. Officially, there are 78 Buddhist temples, 100 Taoist temples, 70 mosques, 2 Catholic churches, and 104 Protestant churches. On April 25, 1948, Comrade Deng Xiaoping held a joint meeting of the revolutionary committee at the China Gospel Fellowship Church which was used as a memorial hall.

Tourism

Pingdingshan thrush Valley: A National "AAA" rated scenic spot and a major tourist attraction in Henan. It is named after the many thrushes breeding here. There are numerous attractions such as cuckoo lake, an area known as "the pocket of the Three Gorges".
Mount Yao: A national "AAAA" rated scenic spot. Located nearby in Lushan County. Originally known as Yaoshan Shirenshan. Home to the Spring Temple Buddha, the second largest statue in the world, built in 2002.

Qizu Pagoda

Twin towns — sister cities 
Pingdingshan, People's Republic of China is twinned with:
 Syzran, Samara Oblast, Russia (11/28/2000)

See also
2009 Henan mine disaster

References

External links

Pingdingshan Municipal People's Government (in Simplified Chinese)
Pingdingshan Information Portal
Pingdingshan News Network
Pingdingshan Economic Network
Tourism in Pingdingshan

 
Cities in Henan
Prefecture-level divisions of Henan
National Forest Cities in China
Populated places established in 1957
1957 establishments in China